Rudrasen Chaudhary is an Indian politician.  He was elected to the Lok Sabha, the lower house of the Parliament of India  as a member of the Bharatiya Janata Party.

References

External links
 Official biographical sketch in Parliament of India website

1930 births
Lok Sabha members from Uttar Pradesh
India MPs 1977–1979
India MPs 1989–1991
India MPs 1991–1996
Bharatiya Janata Party politicians from Uttar Pradesh
Janata Party politicians
Bharatiya Lok Dal politicians
1996 deaths